Jocara noloides is a species of snout moth. It is found on the Bahamas.

References

Moths described in 1916
Jocara